Hermodorus of Salamis was an ancient Greek architect from Salamis, Cyprus who was highly active in ancient Rome between 146 BC and 102 BC, where his work includes the Temple of Jupiter Stator (2nd century BC) and the Temple of Mars. He also inspired Vitruvius and led the construction of the Navalia.

Bibliography
 Pierre Gros, « Hermodoros et Vitruve », Mélanges de l'École française de Rome, vol. 85, no 1, 1973, p. 137-161 
 Albert Grenier, Le Génie romain dans la religion, la pensée, l'art, Albin Michel, 1969
 Jean-Marie Pailler, Les mots de la Rome antique, Presses Universitaires du Mirail, 2001
 Frank Van Wonterghem, Topografia romana : Ricerche e discussioni, Firenze, Leo S. Olschki, 1988

Ancient Roman architects
Ancient Greek architects
2nd-century BC architects